The Ramganga Dam, also known as the Kalagarh Dam, is an embankment dam on the Ramganga River  upstream of Kalagarh in Pauri Garhwal district, Uttarakhand, India. It is located within the Jim Corbett National Park.

Background
The dam is part of the Ramganga Multipurpose Project — an irrigation and hydroelectric project. In addition, it provides for flood control and recreation. Construction on the dam began in 1961 and it was completed in 1974. The three generators in the power station were commissioned in December 1975, November 1976 and March 1977.

Design
The power station at the toe of the dam contains three 66 MW Francis turbine-generators and is afforded  of design hydraulic head.

See also

 List of power stations in India

References

Dams in Uttarakhand
Hydroelectric power stations in Uttarakhand
Embankment dams
Pauri Garhwal district
Dams completed in 1974
Energy infrastructure completed in 1977
1977 establishments in Uttar Pradesh
20th-century architecture in India